Samuel Carr may refer to:

Samuel S. Carr (1837–1908), American painter
Samuel Carr (politician) (1771–1855), American politician and planter